Josef Lošek (14 March 1912 – 29 May 1991) was a Czech cyclist. He competed in the individual and team road race events at the 1936 Summer Olympics.

References

External links
 

1912 births
1991 deaths
Czech male cyclists
Olympic cyclists of Czechoslovakia
Cyclists at the 1936 Summer Olympics
Place of birth missing